Sari Anttonen (born 15 November 1991) is a Finnish orienteering competitor. At the 2016 World Orienteering Championships in Strömstad she won a bronze medal with the Finnish relay team, along with Marika Teini and Merja Rantanen.

References

External links

1991 births
Living people
Finnish orienteers
Female orienteers
Foot orienteers
World Orienteering Championships medalists
Competitors at the 2017 World Games